Aakhri Chetawani (The Last Warning) is a 1993 Hindi action drama film of Bollywood directed and produced by Deva Dutta. This multi-starrer film was released on 10 December 1993 under the banner of Shiv Sai Films.

Plot

Cast
 Bharat Bhushan
 Sudha Chandran
 Raza Murad
 Kader Khan
 Shakti Kapoor
 Vijay Saxena
 Amita Nangia
 Sudhir Dalvi
 Joginder
 Usha Timothy
 Mahesh Raj
 Shrikant Niwaskar
 Paramveer
 Ankush Mohit

Soundtrack 
"Tum Takum" Mohammed Aziz

Reception

References

External links
 

1993 films
1990s Hindi-language films
Indian action drama films
1990s action drama films
1993 drama films